The International Hospital Federation (IHF) is an independent, not-for-profit, non-governmental organization based in Bernex (Canton of Geneva), Switzerland. The IHF is a global association for healthcare management that assists healthcare organizations and facilities in improving their performance by implementing initiatives that enhance their responsiveness, efficiency, accessibility, and quality in meeting the healthcare requirements of people all over the world. The IHF also provides a platform for the global healthcare community to share knowledge, ideas, and experiences, as well as identify international partnerships and collaboration opportunities. Furthermore, the Federation encourages the creation of new national hospital organizations in order to include as many countries as possible in their activities, particularly emerging and developing nations, and to grow their network.  
  
The philosophy of the IHF is based on the principle that it is the right of every human being, regardless of their social, ethical, geographical or economic status, to benefit from the best quality of health care. In upholding these values, the IHF advocates that health policies should take better account of the role and functions of hospitals and the importance of health managers and governing bodies in the adoption and implementation of policy measures.

History

The International Hospital Federation (IHF) was founded in 1929 after the first World Hospital Congress in  Atlantic City, New Jersey. Initially named the International Hospital Association (IHA), the organisation was renamed the International Hospital Federation in 1947.

The first President of the IHF from 1947 onwards was Dr René Sand from Belgium, a pioneer in the field of social medicine and with much experience in international relations. Around this period, a strong relationship with the World Health Organization (WHO) was cultivated and the Federation's development policy continued to expand.

The IHF Secretariat first settled in London, (UK), where it remained for over 50 years. After moving to Ferney-Voltaire, France in 2002, the IHF relocated in 2011, to its current location in Bernex, within the Canton of Geneva, Switzerland. The IHF Secretariat is thus based where those who address today's most pressing challenges amongst IOs, NGOs, permanent missions, and others are located. The relocation of the headquarter was a strategic decision with two objectives: the first being to strengthen the collaboration with global actors that share similar objectives, and second, to be at the heart of the healthcare discussion and make the voice of hospitals heard.

Governance & Organization

Governance 
The governing body of the IHF is divided into three branches: the General Assembly, the Governing Council and the Executive Committee

The General Assembly is the formal decision-making body of the IHF which meets once every year, and if possible, during the World Hospital Congress. The main purpose of the General Assembly is to elect or dismiss the members of the Governing Council, elect the President on the recommendation of the members of the Governing Board but also to elect, suspend or dismiss the honorary members of the IHF.

The Governing Council that meets around three times a year. The Governing Council is responsible for electing an executive committee composed of four persons, namely the President, the President-Designate, the Immediate Past President and the Treasurer. The Federation changes President every two years.

The executive committee that oversees the daily activities of the IHF and supports its Chief Executive Officer, as directed by the Governing Council.

The Secretariat 
The Secretariat is led by a Chief Executive Officer, who leads the programs, projects, and activities of the Federation. The Secretariat manages IHF publications, planning, coordination or implementation of events, congresses, and other initiatives. It is also responsible for member relations and development of projects and activities.

Members 
The IHF's Membership primarily comprises national hospital associations. Under the umbrella of the IHF, these Members come together to encourage the development of responsible health care practices and strengthening the spirit of cooperation among global health actors. To this day, there are three categories of members: Full Members, Associate Members and Honorary Members.

The Full Members category is open to any association or body deemed to be a representative of the healthcare system of a country or territory.

The Associate Members category is open to healthcare organizations, especially hospitals, but also other institutions with a clear relationship to health care providers that are not eligible for full membership. There are two types of Associates Members: independent hospitals that are not affiliated with a full member and Premier members, which are a grouping of health care organizations that cannot apply for full membership but wish to benefit from the IHF's offer and enjoy increased visibility.

The Honorary members who are persons or organizations elected by the General assembly and have rendered special services to the Federation or have distinguished themselves in the hospital and other health services fields.

Partners 
The IHF maintains official relationships with international institutions, such as the Global Health Workforce Alliance (GHWA).

IHF partners range from not-for-profit, non- governmental, international associations to organisations of commercial entities. The IHF is a non-state Actor in Official Relations with the World Health Organization and in consultative status with the ECOSOC. The IHF collaborates with many international institutions such as the Organisation for Economic Co-operation and Development (OECD) and the International Finance Corporation (IFC).

The IHF also partners with many international NGOs such as the International Council of Nurses (ICN), the World Medical Association (WMA), the International Network of Health Promoting Hospitals and Health Services (HPH), the International Society for Quality in Health Care (ISQua), the International Alliance of Patients' Organizations (IAPO), the Geneva Health Forum, the International Committee of the Red Cross (ICRC), the International Federation of Pharmaceutical Manufacturers & Associations (IFPMA), the Union for International Cancer Control (UICC), the World Organization of Family Doctors (WONCA), the World Federation of Public Health Associations (WFPHA) among others.

Activities
The IHF is globally recognized for its work in the health field and is constantly renewing itself to promote cooperation and communication among the major actors in global health. The Federation has thus a menu of key offerings to its members in various areas of health care, in line with modern challenges and issues.

The flagship event hosted by the International Hospital Federation is the World Hospital Congress. The Congress is a unique global forum that brings together IHF members and other executive leaders of hospitals, health services, and healthcare organizations to discuss key drivers of national and international health policy, management, and solutions. Since 2015 it has been held annually across the globe. Through this forum, participants can share knowledge and good practices, exchange new ideas and innovations, and network with other senior executives from across the international healthcare community. In addition to the World Hospital Congress, the IHF organises virtual knowledge sharing events and webinars on niche topics throughout the year.

Alongside the Congress, the IHF also runs a number of leadership initiatives, including the Young Executive program. Established in 2019, the Young Executive Leaders (YEL) program, gives participants the opportunity to expand their professional network and have the voice of their hospitals, region or country represented during international conversations.

The International Hospital Federation recently launched a collaborative platform for senior female executives called ‘Women in Leadership Forum’ that aims to share experiences and build professional relationships to amplify female voices in the workplace. In addition, the IHF hosts a number of Special Interest Groups which offers to its members a platform for international dialogue on specific healthcare topics.

Finally, as a part of the IHF's offering, members are invited to submit nominations for 6 IHF award categories:

·       Dr Kwang Tae Kim Grand Hospital Award

·       Excellence Award for Corporate Social Responsibility

·       Excellence Award for Quality and Patient Safety

·       Excellence Award for Leadership and Management

·       Excellence Award for Green Hospitals

·       Excellence Award for Health Services during Crisis

References

External links

International Hospital Congress official website

Organizations established in 1929